Tirathaba epichthonia is a species of moth of the family Pyralidae. It was described by Edward Meyrick in the year 1937. It is found on Fiji.

References 

Tirathabini
Moths described in 1937